Saint-Didier-des-Bois is a commune in the Eure department in Normandy in northern France.

Population

Personalities
In the early 1930s Antoine de Saint-Exupéry stayed at the house in the middle of the village where he had a friend Lucille Barette. Today this is a bed-and-breakfast.

See also
Communes of the Eure department

References

Communes of Eure